Interleukin 28 receptor, alpha subunit is a subunit for the interleukin-28 receptor. IL28RA is its human gene.

The protein encoded by this gene belongs to the class II cytokine receptor family. This protein forms a receptor complex with interleukin 10 receptor, beta (IL10RB). The receptor complex has been shown to interact with three closely related cytokines, including interleukin 28A (IL28A), interleukin 28B (IL28B), and interleukin 29 (IL29). The expression of all three cytokines can be induced by viral infection. The cells overexpressing this protein have been found to have enhanced responses to IL28A and IL29, but decreased response to IL28B. Three alternatively spliced transcript variants encoding distinct isoforms have been reported.

References

Type II cytokine receptors